is a Japanese stage actor and voice actor who is best known for his stage works, such as originating Takeshi Momoshiro of the first generation Seigaku cast of The Prince of Tennis musical series (commonly called Tenimyu), and as Renji Abarai in Rock Musical BLEACH series. He is currently employed by Sun Music Group and is also a member of the entertainment group.

Moriyama would reprise his role as Momoshiro and reunited with the majority first Seigaku cast to perform in Tenimyus Dream Live 7th concert to celebrate the end of the series' first season. He would return to Tenimyu years later to play the role of Nanjiro Echizen for their second and third seasons.

 Acting Roles 

 TheatreTENIMYU: THE PRINCE OF TENNIS MUSICAL SERIES (as Takeshi Momoshiro)The Prince of Tennis Musical (2003)
The Prince of Tennis Musical: Remarkable 1st Match Fudomine (2003–2004)
The Prince of Tennis Musical: Dream Live 1st (2004)
The Prince of Tennis Musical: More Than Limit St. Rudolph Gakuen (2004)
The Prince of Tennis Musical: Side Fudomine ~Special Match~ (In Winter of 2004–2005)
The Prince of Tennis Musical: Dream Live 7th (2010)Rock Musicals BLEACH (as Renji Abarai)'''
 Rock Musical Bleach (2005)
 Rock Musical Bleach: Saien (2006)
 Rock Musical Bleach: The Dark of the Bleeding Moon (2006)
 Rock Musical Bleach: Live Bankai Show Code 001 (2007)
 Rock Musical Bleach: No Clouds in the Blue Heavens (2007)
 Rock Musical Bleach: The All (2008)
 Rock Musical Bleach: Live Bankai Show Code 002 (2008)
 Rock Musical Bleach: Live Bankai Show Code 003 (2010)

Other
 Various Shiro x Kuro productions, as a member
 Various  productions, as a member and producer
 Waga Machi
 Towering Life
 Comic Jack as Rascal
 OH! BABY as Eiji Sawamura
 Moeyo Ken
 Hallelujah as Eiji
 ZIPPER
 Angela
 Jump Festa Stage One Piece as Roronoa Zoro
 Ending Note: Yuruka na Zetsubou
 bambino
 Den'en no Shisu
 30
 bambino 2
 Sukedachi
 abbey
 bambino+
 Shin Ugetsu Monogatari
 31
 bambino 0
 Every Little Thing
 Samurai 7

Cinema 
 The Prince of Tennis (film) (2006) as Genichirou Sanada (cameo)
 Waterboys (2001) as captain of the basketball team

Voice Acting

Anime 
 Dr. Rin ni Kiitemite! (TV) as Kanzaki Koumi
 Eyeshield 21 (TV) as Kotaro Sasaki
 Good Morning Call (OAV) as Uehara Hisashi
 The Prince of Tennis (series & OVAs) as Ibu Shinji
 The Prince of Tennis: Atobe's Gift (movie) as Ibu Shinji

Game 
 GetBackers: Dakkanya as Midou Ban
 The Prince of Tennis series as Ibu Shinji
 The Prince of Tennis: SWEAT&TEARS as Toudou Kengo, Ibu Shinji

External links
  profile
 Sun Music profile
 Official blog
 

Living people
1976 births
Japanese male stage actors
Japanese male voice actors
Actors from Nagasaki Prefecture
Male voice actors from Nagasaki Prefecture